Paul Vincent Carroll (10 July 1900 – 20 October 1968) was an Irish dramatist and writer of movie scenarios and television scripts.

Carroll was born in Blackrock, County Louth, Ireland and trained as a teacher at St Patrick's College, Dublin and settled in Glasgow in 1921 as a teacher. Several of his plays were produced by the Abbey Theatre in Dublin. He co-founded, with Grace Ballantine and Molly Urquhart, the Curtain Theatre Company in Glasgow.

Personal life
Carroll and his wife, clothing designer Helena Reilly, had three daughters; the youngest was actress Helena Carroll (1928–2013). He also had a son, Brian Francis, born in 1945.

Paul Vincent Carroll died at age 68 in Bromley, Kent England..He died in his sleep from heart failure.

He was a close friend of Patrick Kavanagh's in the 1920s.

List of works

The Watched Pot (unpublished)
The Things That are Caesar's (London, 1934) 
Shadow and Substance (1937, won the Casement Award and the New York Drama Critics' Circle Award)
The White Steed (1939, won Drama Critics’ Circle Award)
The Strings Are False (1942, published as The Strings My Lord Are False, 1944)
Coggerers (1944, later renamed The Conspirators)
The Old Foolishness (1944)
The Wise Have Not Spoken (1947)
Saints and Sinners 1949
She Went by Gently (1953, *Irish Writing* magazine. Republished in 1955 in 44 Irish Short Stories edited by Devin A. Garrity)

References

External links 

 Paul Vincent Carroll Collection at the Harry Ransom Center

1900 births
1968 deaths
People from County Louth
Irish male dramatists and playwrights
20th-century Irish dramatists and playwrights
20th-century male writers
Alumni of St Patrick's College, Dublin
Scottish people of Irish descent
Irish schoolteachers
Scottish dramatists and playwrights